Claral Lewis Gillenwater (May 20, 1900 – February 26, 1978) was a pitcher in Major League Baseball. He played for the Chicago White Sox in 1923.

References

External links

1900 births
1978 deaths
Major League Baseball pitchers
Chicago White Sox players
Peoria Tractors players
San Francisco Seals (baseball) players
Baseball players from Indiana